Ronald Lee Fowler (born July 23, 1944) is an American businessman. He is the vice chairman of the ownership group of the San Diego Padres franchise in Major League Baseball (MLB) and CEO of Liquid Investments Inc., a San Diego beer distributorship.

Early life 
Fowler was born to Loren W. and Leona (Mohs) Fowler on July 23, 1944 in Minneapolis, Minnesota, the oldest of two children. Fowler's father served in the U.S. Navy during World War II, stationed in New Guinea. Fowler was raised as Catholic, attending St. Cloud Cathedral High School where he played baseball.

Liquid Investments
Fowler is the chairman and CEO of privately held Liquid Investments Inc., the parent company of former operating entities in California and Colorado. The investment group distributed Miller, Coors, Heineken, and other beer brands; and had annual sales exceeding $220 million.

San Diego Padres
Fowler was a member of a minority group that owned 49.32 percent of the Padres. The group, headed by then-Padres chief executive Jeff Moorad, attempted to buy the Padres from controlling owner John Moores for $530 million, but the deal fell through in April 2012. Fowler then replaced Moorad as the general partner of the minority group, and he served on the Padres executive committee.

Fowler joined a new group to purchase the Padres that included four heirs to the O’Malley family—who owned the Los Angeles Dodgers franchise for five decades. Kevin and Brian O'Malley are the sons of former Dodgers owner Peter O'Malley and grandsons of Walter O'Malley, the owner who moved the Dodgers west from Brooklyn after the 1957 season. Peter and Tom Seidler are the nephews of Peter O’Malley. MLB approved the $800 million sale, which completed on August 28, 2012. As much as $200 million of the sale price included the team's 20-percent stake in Fox Sports San Diego, a cable channel that pays the Padres annual fees as part of a $1.2 billion, 20-year agreement. Fowler was named the ownership group's executive chairman and was designated to represent the Padres in all league meetings. He became the first locally based control person of the team since founding owner C. Arnholdt Smith. Under the Fowler/Siedler/O'Malley group, the Padres have signed 3 players to contracts that beat the previous franchise record contract, giving 6 years and $83 million to Wil Myers in January 2017, 8 years and $144 million to Eric Hosmer in February 2018, and 10 years and $300 million to Manny Machado in February 2019.

On November 18, 2020, MLB approved Fowler transferring the role of chairman to Peter Seidler, who purchased a stake in the team from Fowler to become the largest stakeholder. Fowler remains with the team as vice chairman.

Other interests
Fowler owned the San Diego Sockers, an indoor soccer team that won 10 championships in 11 years. He also chaired San Diego's first task force that selected a site for what was eventually Petco Park, and he chaired the host committee for Super Bowl XXXVII held in Qualcomm Stadium in 2003.

Philanthropy
Fowler and his wife Alexis have made major contributions to her alma mater, San Diego State University. The school's College of Business Administration was renamed the Fowler College of Business in 2016 in response to the couple's $25 million endowment pledge to the business school. An earlier challenge donation that raised $10 million for the athletics center resulted in its being named the Fowler Athletic Center. The Fowler family has also donated to his alma mater, the University of St. Thomas, with contributions toward the Fowler Veranda of the football and outdoor track and field stadium.

References

External links

California State University bio
San Diego Padres bio

1944 births
Living people
American chief executives of food industry companies
Major League Baseball owners
People from St. Cloud, Minnesota
San Diego Padres owners
Carlson School of Management alumni
University of St. Thomas (Minnesota) alumni